"Fuck Love" (censored as "F Love", "F**k Love", or simply "Love") is a song by American rapper and singer XXXTentacion featuring fellow American rapper and singer Trippie Redd and is taken from the former's debut studio album 17 (2017). The song was released on August 24, 2017, a day ahead of the album's release. before being sent to rhythmic radio on January 23, 2018. It was produced by Nick Mira, Taz Taylor, and Dex Duncan.

Commercial performance
"Fuck Love" entered at number 41 on the US Billboard Hot 100 and eventually peaked at number 28 after his death. On March 29, 2019, the song became the most streamed song ever on the streaming platform SoundCloud with 206 million streams.

Personnel
XXXTentacion – primary artist, songwriter
Trippie Redd - featured artist, songwriter
Taz Taylor – producer
Nick Mira - producer, songwriter
Dex Duncan - producer
Koen Heldens – mixing engineer

Charts

Weekly charts

Year-end charts

Certifications

References

External links

2018 singles
2017 songs
XXXTentacion songs
Trippie Redd songs
Songs written by XXXTentacion
Empire Distribution singles
Songs written by Trippie Redd
Songs written by Nick Mira
Songs written by Taz Taylor (record producer)

Song recordings produced by Taz Taylor (record producer)